Mariagerfjord is a municipality (Danish, kommune) in North Jutland Region in Denmark.  It covers an area of 723.63 km² (2011) and a has a population of 41,662 (2022).

On 1 January 2007 Mariagerfjord municipality was created as the result of Kommunalreformen ("The Municipal Reform" of 2007), consisting of the former municipalities of Arden, Hadsund and Hobro, and the major part of Mariager, and a very small part of Aalestrup and a very small part of Nørager municipality.

The municipality consists of the land around Mariager Fjord, its namesake.

Locations

Politics

Municipal council
Mariagerfjord's municipal council consists of 29 members, elected every four years.

Below are the municipal councils elected since the Municipal Reform of 2007.

References 

 Municipal statistics: NetBorger Kommunefakta, delivered from KMD aka Kommunedata (Municipal Data)
 Municipal mergers and neighbors: Eniro new municipalities map

External links 

  
  Municipal Key Figures - area

 
Municipalities of the North Jutland Region
Municipalities of Denmark
Populated places established in 2007